Ramazan Magomedovich Shumakhov (born 16 July 1969) is a Russian football manager and a former player.

Club career
He made his Russian Football National League debut for FC Druzhba Maykop on 9 May 1992 in a game against FC Metallurg Lipetsk. He played 7 seasons in the FNL for Druzhba.

External links
 

1969 births
Living people
Soviet footballers
Russian footballers
FC Akhmat Grozny players
Russian football managers
Association football defenders
FC Spartak-UGP Anapa players